Old Town is a city in Penobscot County, Maine, United States. The population was 7,431 at the 2020 census. The city's developed area is chiefly located on the relatively large Marsh Island, though its boundaries extend beyond that. The island is surrounded and defined by the Penobscot River to the east and the Stillwater River to the west.

History
Abenaki Indians called it Pannawambskek, meaning "where the ledges spread out," referring to rapids and drops in the river bed. The French established a Jesuit Catholic mission here in the 1680s. Nearly a century later after Great Britain took over French territory following its victory in the Seven Years' War, the area was settled by English pioneers in 1774. The name Old Town derives from "Indian Old Town", which was the English name for the largest Penobscot Indian village, now known as Indian Island.

Located within the city limits but on its own island in the Penobscot River, the reservation is the current and historical home of the Penobscot Nation.

In 1820, when the present city was set off from neighboring Orono (named for a Penobscot sachem), it was given the name Old Town because it contained the Penobscot village. Over time, the Penobscot village ceased to be called Old Town and the name migrated to the much newer American settlement across the river.

Old Town may be best known for Old Town Canoe Co., a major manufacturer of canoes and kayaks, which has been based in the city for more than 100 years. The city's location along a series of rapids in the Penobscot River, near the head of tide just downstream in Bangor, made it an ideal location in the 1800s to marshal the water power for mills to process lumber from the millions of board feet of spruce and pine logs floated annually down the Penobscot.

Today many residents work for the University of Maine in Orono and the Eastern Maine Medical Center in Bangor, the two largest employers in the area. Old Town is home to a former Georgia-Pacific paper mill, which is being redeveloped for adaptive reuse.

The city of Old Town includes Treat-Webster Island (a.k.a. "French Island"), a predominantly residential neighborhood located on a small island in the middle of the Penobscot River. French Island is the intermediate land mass between Milford and Old Town; it is connected on either side by a bridge.

Geography

Old Town is located at  (44.943047, −68.676461).

With its business district located on an island, Old Town is drained by the Stillwater River and Penobscot River.

The city is crossed by Interstate 95, U. S. Route 2 and 2A, and state routes 16, 43 and 116. It borders the towns of Orono to the south, Glenburn to the west, Hudson to the northwest, Alton and Argyle Township to the north, and (separated by water) is near Milford east, and Bradley to the southeast.

Climate

This climatic region is typified by large seasonal temperature differences, with warm to hot (and often humid) summers and cold (sometimes severely cold) winters.  According to the Köppen Climate Classification system, Old Town has a humid continental climate, abbreviated "Dfb" on climate maps.

Demographics

2010 census
As of the census of 2010, there were 7,840 people, 3,382 households, and 1,884 families living in the city. The racial makeup of the city was 93.1% White, 0.9% African American, 1.6% Native American, 1.8% Asian, 0.1% Pacific Islander, 0.3% from other races, and 2.2% from two or more races. Hispanic or Latino of any race were 1.3% of the population.

There were 3,382 households, of which 24.8% had children under the age of 18 living with them, 40.7% were married couples living together, 11.7% had a female householder with no husband present, 3.4% had a male householder with no wife present, and 44.3% were non-families. 27.0% of all households were made up of individuals, and 10.7% had someone living alone who was 65 years of age or older. The average household size was 2.31 and the average family size was 2.76.

The median age in the city was 33 years. 17.9% of residents were under the age of 18; 20.4% were between the ages of 18 and 24; 24.3% were from 25 to 44; 23.6% were from 45 to 64; and 13.8% were 65 years of age or older. The gender makeup of the city was 48.3% male and 51.7% female.

2000 census
As of the census of 2000, there were 8,130 people, 3,426 households, and 1,993 families living in the city. The racial makeup of the city was 94.62% White, 0.65% African American, 1.48% Native American, 1.83% Asian, 0.04% Pacific Islander, 0.28% from other races, and 1.09% from two or more races. Hispanic or Latino of any race were 0.52% of the population.

There were 3,426 households, out of which 26.1% had children under the age of 18 living with them, 44.7% were married couples living together, 10.1% had a female householder with no husband present, and 41.8% were non-families. 29.1% of all households were made up of individuals, and 11.7% had someone living alone who was 65 years of age or older. The average household size was 2.30 and the average family size was 2.83.

In the city, the population was spread out, with 20.0% under the age of 18; 18.3% from 18 to 24; 27.0% from 25 to 44; 20.8% from 45 to 64; and 13.9% who were 65 years of age or older. The median age was 34 years. For every 100 females, there were 91.2 males. For every 100 females age 18 and over, there were 90.8 males.

The median income for a household in the city was $29,886, and the median income for a family was $40,589. Males had a median income of $32,961 versus $23,723 for females. The per capita income for the city was $16,100. About 11.8% of families and 18.6% of the population were below the poverty line, including 14.6% of those under age 18 and 14.6% of those age 65 or over.

Education

Old Town is part of Regional School Unit (RSU) #34, which includes the towns of Alton, Bradley, and Old Town. The RSU is composed of five schools: Alton Elementary School, Viola Rand Elementary School, Old Town Elementary School, Leonard Middle School, and Old Town High School. In 2006–2007 the school changed its mascot from the Old Town Indians to the Old Town Coyotes.  A new community project to renovate the high school track and bolster the school's athletic facilities broke ground in 2013. Old Town's school colors are green and white.

 RSU #34: Alton, Bradley, and Old Town
 Stillwater Montessori School

Government
Old Town uses a city council with seven elected councilors, including a Council President. As of March 2020, the current mayor of Old Town is David Mahan.

Historic buildings
Listed in the National Register of Historic Places:  
 St. Anne's Church and Mission Site, located on Indian Island
 St. James Episcopal Church, designed by Boston-based English architect Henry Vaughan
 Edith Marion Patch House (known as Braeside)

Sites of interest
 Old Town Museum
 Sewall Park on Perch Pond (formerly known as Mud Pond)

Notable people

 Doris Twitchell Allen, psychologist, founder of the Children's International Summer Villages
 Samuel Cony, 31st governor of Maine
 James Dill, state legislator
 Matthew Dunlap, 47th Secretary of State of Maine
 Patty Griffin, singer-songwriter
 Chad Hayes, University of Maine and NFL football player
 Charles Davis Jameson, Civil War general
 Molly Spotted Elk, actress and dancer
 Tabitha King, author, wife of author Stephen King
 Bud Leavitt Jr., longtime editor and columnist, The Bangor Daily News, television host
 Dick MacPherson, head coach of the New England Patriots
 Nick Noonan, founding member of Karmin
 David Richard Porter, YMCA youth leader and Maine's first Rhodes Scholar
 Charles W. Roberts, Civil War general
 Aaron Y. Ross, 'Old West' character
 George P. Sewall, speaker of the Maine House of Representatives
 Joseph Sewall, president of the Maine Senate
 Andrew Sockalexis, Olympic athlete
 Louis "Chief" Sockalexis, first Native American major league baseball player
 Mary Ellen St. John, Miss Maine 1954
 Gary Thorne, Broadcaster
 Walter E. Webber, lawyer and Mason
 George F. Wilson, catcher with the Detroit Tigers and Boston Red Sox

References

External links

 City of Old Town, Maine
 Old Town Public Library
 Bangor Region Chamber of Commerce

 
Cities in Maine
Populated places established in 1774
Cities in Penobscot County, Maine
1774 establishments in the Thirteen Colonies